Written in itself may refer to:
Self-interpreter
Self-hosting